The 1868 United States presidential election in Illinois took place on November 3, 1868, as part of the 1868 United States presidential election. Voters chose 16 representatives, or electors to the Electoral College, who voted for president and vice president.

Illinois voted for the Republican nominee, Ulysses S. Grant, over the Democratic nominee, Horatio Seymour. Grant won his home state by a margin of 11.38%.

Results

See also
 United States presidential elections in Illinois

References

Illinois
1868
1868 Illinois elections